Murder of a Cat is a 2014 American comedy thriller film directed by Gillian Greene and starring Fran Kranz, Nikki Reed, J. K. Simmons, Leonardo Nam, Blythe Danner, and Greg Kinnear. The film premiered at the 2014 Tribeca Film Festival, and was given a limited theatrical release in the Unites States on December 5, 2014, by Gravitas Ventures.

This was Greene's second collaboration with Kranz, Rao, and Simmons. The first was her directorial debut short film Fanboy. The film is also the Raimi brothers' second film with Simmons, after the Spider-Man trilogy (2002–2007), and their second film with Rao, after Drag Me to Hell (2009).

Synopsis
When someone murders his beloved cat, Clinton demands justice. Taking it upon himself to solve the case, he teams up with an unlikely ally, Greta, and the two set out to find the culprit lurking in their small suburban town. However, as Clinton searches for the truth, he begins to uncover a conspiracy that goes far deeper than he anticipated.

Cast
 Fran Kranz as Clinton
 Nikki Reed as Greta
 Greg Kinnear as Al Ford
 J. K. Simmons as Sheriff Hoyle
 Leonardo Nam as Yi Kim
 Blythe Danner as Edie
 Ted Raimi as Young Sheriff
 Dileep Rao as Doctor Mundhra

Production
The screenplay was on the Hollywood "Black List" survey in 2010. In August 2012, Fran Kranz replaced Jay Baruchel in the lead role. The film was shot on location in Los Angeles in 2013 by Seine Pictures and Raimi Productions.

Reception
On Rotten Tomatoes the film has an approval rating of 30%. On Metacritic it has a score of 31 out of 100 based on reviews from 8 critics, indicating "generally unfavorable reviews". Kranz took a lot of the criticism along with Greene's direction.

References

External links
 
 

2014 films
2014 black comedy films
2014 comedy-drama films
2014 independent films
2014 thriller films
2010s American films
2010s comedy thriller films
2010s English-language films
American black comedy films
American comedy-drama films
American comedy thriller films
American independent films
Films produced by Sam Raimi
Films scored by Deborah Lurie
Films shot in Los Angeles